is a professional Japanese baseball player. He plays infielder for the Orix Buffaloes.

References 

1993 births
Living people
Baseball people from Okinawa Prefecture
Rikkyo University alumni
Nippon Professional Baseball infielders
Orix Buffaloes players